Mongolia will compete at the 2009 World Championships in Athletics from 15 to 23 August in Berlin. Both of the athletes are competing in the men's and women's marathon events.

Team selection

Results

References

External links
Official competition website

Nations at the 2009 World Championships in Athletics
World Championships in Athletics
Mongolia at the World Championships in Athletics